The name Grayston may refer to:

Given name
 Grayston Burgess (born 1932), English countertenor and conductor
 Greyston Holt (born 1985), Canadian actor.
 Grayston Ives (born 1948), British composer, singer and choral director
 Grayston Lynch (1923–2008), American soldier and CIA officer

Surname
 Chris Grayston (active since 1990), British promoter and musician
 Kenneth Grayston (1914–2005), British theologian
 Neil Grayston (actor) (born 1981), Canadian actor
 Neil Grayston (footballer) (born 1975), English footballer